Nemophora umbripennis is a moth of the Adelidae family or fairy longhorn moths. It was described by Stringer in 1930. It is found on the Kuriles and in Japan.

The wingspan is 14–16 mm for males and 13–14 mm for females.

References

Adelidae
Moths described in 1930
Moths of Japan